Maksim Horbach (born 14 September 1983) is a retired Belarusian professional footballer.

External links
Profile at teams.by

1983 births
Living people
Belarusian footballers
FC Kommunalnik Slonim players
FC Torpedo Minsk players
FC Darida Minsk Raion players
FC Neman Grodno players
FC Dynamo Brest players
FC Partizan Minsk players
FC Rudziensk players
FC SKVICH Minsk players
FC Rechitsa-2014 players
FC Isloch Minsk Raion players
Association football midfielders